Bagdad Cafe the Trench Town is Japanese reggae band founded in 2001. Their début album Love Sunset was released in 2003. The front-woman, Mai, sings mostly in Japanese but adds in many English words too. In 2008 the band took part in the Fuji Rock Festival for the first time.

The group took their name from a combination of the 1987 West German movie "Bagdad Café", and the Trenchtown neighbourhood in Kingston, Jamaica.

Members
 Mai - vocals
 Raita - guitar
 Muramoto - guitar
 Big mom - chorus
 Ran - chorus
  - piano
 Umeken - trombone
  - organ
 Ogi - tenor saxophone
 Yama - bass
  - drums

Discography

Studio albums

Singles

Compilations

References

External links
 Bagdad Cafe the Trench Town Official Website (Japanese)
 BAGDAD's SISTERS Official blog (Japanese)
 Victor Entertainment (Japanese)
 Oricon Style (Japanese ranking)

Japanese reggae musical groups
Musical groups established in 2001
Musical groups from Osaka